Davidson Ngibuini Kuguru was a Kenyan MP who represented Mathira Constituency.

References

Year of birth missing
Year of death missing
Kenyan politicians